Austropusilla hilum is a species of sea snail, a marine gastropod mollusk in the family Raphitomidae.

Description
The length of the shell attains 3.85 mm, its diameter 1.25 mm.

(Original description by Hedley) The  minute shell is acicular and thin. Its colour is amber-brown, passing to purple on the apex. It contains five whorls, wound obliquely. The first whorl is minute, the last measures two-thirds of the whole shell. The sculpture consists of fine spiral grooves which become more crowded anteriorly. The aperture is long and narrow, suddenly contracted anteriorly. The sinus is deeply excavate. A thin sheet of callus is spread on the columella. The siphonal canal is broad, short and a little recurved.

Distribution
This marine species is endemic to Australia and occurs off New South Wales and Tasmania and Victoria

References

 May, W.L. 1923. An illustrated index of Tasmanian shells: with 47 plates and 1052 species. Hobart : Government Printer 100 pp.
 Laseron, C. 1954. Revision of the New South Wales Turridae (Mollusca). Australian Zoological Handbook. Sydney : Royal Zoological Society of New South Wales pp. 56, pls 1–12
 Powell, A.W.B. 1966. The molluscan families Speightiidae and Turridae, an evaluation of the valid taxa, both Recent and fossil, with list of characteristic species. Bulletin of the Auckland Institute and Museum. Auckland, New Zealand 5: 1–184, pls 1–23

External links
 Biolib.cz : image
 
  Hedley, C. 1922. A revision of the Australian Turridae. Records of the Australian Museum 13(6): 213-359, pls 42-56 

hilum
Gastropods described in 1908
Gastropods of Australia